The Islamic Kurdish League is a Kurdish Islamic Sunni Charity organization, in Iraqi Kurdistan.

Activities
The group's official website reports that their organization established 552 mosques in the Iraqi cities of Dohuk, Erbil, Sulaymaniyah, Kirkuk , Garmian and Mosul from the years of 1992 to 2015. The group also claims to have built 16 schools and established a number of health centers and water projects.

See also
Kurdistan

References

External links
IKL official website

Kurdish organisations
Kurdish Islamic organisations